Edward Lyttleton Fox  (born 1958 in New York), resident in London, is a writer from the United States.

Published works
Edward Fox is the author of three books:

 "Obscure Kingdoms: Journeys to distant royal courts" (London: Hamish Hamilton, 1993, and Penguin, 1995).
 "Palestine Twilight': the murder of Dr Albert Glock and the archaeology of the Holy Land" (London: HarperCollins, 2001 and 2002).
 Reprinted in the United States as "Sacred Geography: A tale of murder and archaeology in the Holy Land" (Henry Holt/Metropolitan Books, 2001 and 2002).
 Spanish translation "Crepusculo en Palestina" (Barcelona: Alba Editorial, 2003).

 "The Hungarian who walked to heaven: Alexander Csoma de Koros" (London: Short Books, 2001). Life of traveller and philologist Sándor Kőrösi Csoma, 1784—1842

References

1958 births
Living people
American biographers
American male biographers
American non-fiction crime writers
American travel writers